Mauricio Molina (born 20 December 1966) is an Argentine professional golfer.

Career
Molina was born in Rio Cuarto, Cordoba. He worked as a caddie in Buenos Aires, before turning professional in 1985. He is the nephew of the Argentine golfer, Florentino Molina.

Molina won several tournaments in Argentina and South America, including the Mendoza Open in 1999 and the Metropolitan Championship in 2009. In 1997 he shot 59 in the first round of the Nautico Hacoaj Grand Prix to set the record for the best round in Argentina.

In 2009 Molina played on the Canadian Tour and recorded two victories at the Costa Rica Classic and Mexican PGA Championship, finishing the season in fourth place on the Order of Merit.

Molina played on the European Tour in 1998 and 2001, and the second tier Challenge Tour between 2003 and 2008. His best tournament finishes were third at the 2004 Costa Rica Open and fifth at the Los Encinos Open in 2005.

Molina finished fifth in the 2018 European Senior Tour qualifying school to gain a place on that tour.

Professional wins (23)

Canadian Tour wins (2)

1Co-sanctioned by the Tour de las Américas

Tour de las Américas wins (2)

1Co-sanctioned by the Canadian Tour
2Co-sanctioned by the TPG Tour

TPG Tour wins (4)

1Co-sanctioned by the Tour de las Américas

PGA Tour Latinoamérica Developmental Series wins (2)

Argentine wins (2)
 1997 Nautico Hacoaj Grand Prix
 1999 Mendoza Open

Cordoba Tour wins (2)
 2002 Rio Cuarto Tournament
 2003 Villa Maria Tournament

Other wins in Argentina (5)
 1996 Pilar Grand Prix (Driving Range Circuit)
 1997 SHA Grand Prix Pro-Am
 2007 Los Lagartos Tournament (ProGolf Tour), Las Praderas Tournament (ProGolf Tour)
 2012 Juan J. Galli Cup

Other South American wins (5)
 1994 Ecuador Open
 2006 Hacienda de Chicureo Open (Chile)
 2012 Chile Open
 2013 Santa Augusta Open (Chile), CBG PRO TOUR Brasília (Brazil)

European Senior Tour wins (1)

Results in senior major championships

"T" indicates a tie for a place
CUT = missed the halfway cut
NT = No tournament due to COVID-19 pandemic

References

External links

Argentine male golfers
PGA Tour Latinoamérica golfers
European Tour golfers
Sportspeople from Córdoba Province, Argentina
People from Río Cuarto, Córdoba
1966 births
Living people